Ingvild Bakkerud (born 9 July 1995) is a Norwegian handball player for Herning-Ikast Håndbold and the Norwegian national team

She also represented Norway at the 2014 Women's Junior World Handball Championship, placing 9th.

Achievements
World Youth Championship:
Bronze Medalist: 2012
Danish League:
Silver Medalist: 2020
Bronze Medalist: 2019
Danish Cup:
Finalist: 2018, 2019

References

External links

1995 births
Living people
People from Kongsberg
Norwegian female handball players
Expatriate handball players
Norwegian expatriate sportspeople in Denmark
Sportspeople from Viken (county)